Morten Gjerdrum Aasen (born 14 October 1957) is a Norwegian equestrian. He competed in the individual jumping event at the 1992 Summer Olympics.

References

1957 births
Living people
Equestrians at the 1992 Summer Olympics
Norwegian male equestrians
Olympic equestrians of Norway
Sportspeople from Oslo